Abdulhussain Abdulredha (15 July 1939 – 11 August 2017) was an iconic Kuwaiti actor.

Background
Abdulredha was born in Derwazat Al Abdulrazzaq, Al-Awazem village in Sharq, Kuwait, to Kuwaiti Ajam parents, the seventh among 14 siblings. He initially worked in the Department of Printing of the Kuwaiti Ministry of Guidance and Information. He then traveled on a mission to Egypt at the expense of the ministry in 1956 to learn the art of printmaking, and in 1961 he traveled on a mission to Germany to complete his studies in the printmaking arts. He continued this job until he reached the position of observer in the Printing Section of the Ministry of Information. He married four wives and has three daughters and two sons, among them Bashar and Adnan, who works in the technical field and has attempted to write poetry and the preparation of TV programs, as well as Mona, Bebe, and Manal. He was a Shia Muslim.

Assassination attempt
After the liberation of Kuwait, the art scene saw a lot of drama about the invasion. Abdulredha presented a play called Sword of the Arabs in 1992, addressing the period of the invasion. He survived an assassination attempt on his way to one of the performances by suspected Iraqi mukhabarat.

Death
On 11 August 2017, Abdul redha died of heart attack in the Royal Brompton Hospital in London; aged 78. His funeral was held in the afternoon of August 16, 2017, in Kuwait. He died in a city that he used as a name to one of his most popular comedies called "Bye Bye London", which was about rich Arabic people that travel to London and try to settle there. One of his lines was "Get off my back, I’m in London to have fun, to change scenery and enjoy myself. I’m not in London to be hospitalized". However in real life he has been hospitalized there and died at the age of 78.

Filmography

TV series
Year of Production Serial Personal Participation

1977 Darb Alzalaq Hussein Bin Acol Saad Al-Faraj, Khalid Al-Nafisi, Abdul Aziz al-Nimesh, the useful
1977 Fate Hammoud Tawash Saad Al Faraj, Abdul Aziz al-Nimesh, Ghanem Al Saleh
1981 Tutorial Noah Suad Abdullah, Ibrahim Sallal, Maryam Saleh, Hayat Al Fahad
2009 Big Love Khalifa Fenner Ibrahim Harbi, Badriya Ahmed, inspiration residue, Ahmed Salman

Cinema
Year of Production Name of the movie Participation
1965 Storm Khalid Al-Nafisi

Gala and achievements
2010: Kuwait – Honoring Festival Medley.
2010:  Jordan – Honor award from Jordan Arab Media Festival.

References

External links

Abdulredha at elcinema.com
Gulf Film Festival Honours GCC Film Legends

1939 births
2017 deaths
Kuwaiti Shia Muslims
Kuwaiti male actors
Kuwaiti people of Iranian descent
Kuwaiti male stage actors
Male radio actors
Kuwaiti male film actors
Male telenovela actors
20th-century Kuwaiti male actors
21st-century Kuwaiti male actors
People from Kuwait City